The spin angular momentum of light (SAM) is the component of angular momentum of light that is associated with the quantum spin and the rotation between the polarization degrees of freedom of the photon.

Introduction 
Spin is the fundamental property that distinguishes the two types of elementary particles: fermions with half-integer spins and bosons with integer spins. Photons, which are the quanta of light, have been long recognized as spin-1 gauge bosons. The polarization of the light is commonly accepted as its “intrinsic” spin degree of freedom. However, in free space, only two transverse polarizations are allowed. Thus, the photon spin is always only connected to the two circular polarizations. To construct the full quantum spin operator of light, longitudinal polarized photon modes have to be introduced.

An electromagnetic wave is said to have circular polarization when its electric and magnetic fields rotate continuously around the beam axis during propagation. The circular polarization is left or right depending on the field rotation direction and, according to the convention used: either from the point of view of the source, or the receiver. Both conventions are used in science depending on the context.

This SAM is directed along the beam axis (parallel if positive, antiparallel if negative).
The above figure shows the instantaneous structure of the electric field of left and right circularly polarized light in space. The green arrows indicate the propagation direction.

The mathematical expressions reported under the figures give the three electric-field components of a circularly polarized plane wave propagating in the  direction, in complex notation.

Mathematical expression 

General expression for the spin angular momentum is

The general expression for the orbital angular momentum of light is

where  denotes four indices of the spacetime and Einstein's summation convention has been applied. To quantize light, the basic

equal-time commutation relations have to be postulated,

Then, one can verify that both  and  satisfy the canonical angular momentum commutation relations

and they commute with each other .

After the plane-wave expansion, the photon spin can be re-expressed in a simple and intuitive form in the wave-vector space

where the column-vector  is the field operator of the photon in wave-vector space and the  matrix

is the spin-1 operator of the photon with the SO(3) rotation generators

and the two unit vectors  denote the two transverse polarizations of light in free space and unit vector  denotes the longitudinal polarization.

To incorporate the gauge invariance into the photon angular momenta, a re-decomposition of the total QED angular momentum and the Lorenz gauge condition have to be enforced. Finally, the direct observable part of spin and orbital angular momenta of light are given by

and

which recover the angular momenta of classical transverse light. Here, is the transverse part of the electric field (vector potential),  is the vacuum permittivity, and we are using SI units.

We can define the annihilation operators for circularly polarized transverse photons:

with polarization unit vectors

Then, the transverse-field photon spin can be re-expressed as

For a single plane-wave photon, the spin can only have two values , which are eigenvalues of the spin operator . The corresponding eigenfunctions describing photons with well defined values of SAM are described as circularly polarized waves:

See also
 Helmholtz equation
 Orbital angular momentum of light
 Photon polarization
 Spin polarization

References

Further reading

Angular momentum of light
Light
Physical quantities